Benton Middle Senior High School is a tiny, rural, public combined middle school and high school in Benton, Pennsylvania. As of 2018, BAHS had 179 students enrolled.

Benton Middle Senior High School serves the Boroughs of Benton and Stillwater and Benton Township, Fishing Creek Township, Jackson Township and Sugarloaf Township in Columbia County, Pennsylvania. The school is the sole middle school and high school operated by the Benton Area School District.

Extracurriculars 
The Benton Middle Senior High School offers a wide variety of clubs, activities and a sports program.

Sports
According to PIAA directory July 2012, the district funds: 

Boys
Baseball - A
Basketball- A
Golf - AA
Soccer - A
Wrestling - AA

Girls
Basketball - A
Field hockey - AA
Golf - AA
Soccer (fall) - A
Softball - A

Middle school sports

Boys
Basketball
Soccer
Wrestling

Girls
Basketball
Field hockey

References

Public high schools in Pennsylvania
Schools in Columbia County, Pennsylvania